Giovanni Zucca (born 11 December 1907 in Sestri Ponente) was an Italian professional football player.

He played 2 games in 2 seasons in the Serie A for A.S. Roma.

1907 births
Year of death missing
Italian footballers
Serie A players
U.C. Sampdoria players
A.S. Roma players
F.S. Sestrese Calcio 1919 players
Association football goalkeepers